Birch Lake is a lake  south of Barnsdall, Oklahoma, Oklahoma,  southwest of Bartlesville and  northwest of Tulsa. The total capacity is: , subdivided into: Conservation , Flood control , and Inactive storage .

The lake is formed from Birch Creek, a tributary of Bird Creek.  It eventually empties into the Arkansas River.

The lake has largemouth bass, walleye, spotted bass, smallmouth bass, hybrid striped bass, black and white crappie, channel and flathead catfish, and different types of sunfish.
The marine law enforcement branch of the Oklahoma Highway Patrol, Troop W, is headquartered at Birch Lake.

References

External links
 Map of Birch Lake
 Oklahoma Digital Maps: Digital Collections of Oklahoma and Indian Territory

Protected areas of Osage County, Oklahoma
Reservoirs in Oklahoma
Bodies of water of Osage County, Oklahoma